Baksansky (masculine), Baksanskaya (feminine), or Baksanskoye (neuter) may refer to:

Baksansky District of the Kabardino-Balkar Republic, Russia
Baksansky (rural locality), in the Kabardino-Balkar Republic, Russia